Jorge-Emilio Lazzarini (born 23 February 1955) is an Argentine alpine skier. He competed in three events at the 1972 Winter Olympics.

References

External links
 

1955 births
Living people
Argentine male alpine skiers
Olympic alpine skiers of Argentina
Alpine skiers at the 1972 Winter Olympics
Place of birth missing (living people)